In mathematics, the axiom of dependent choice, denoted by , is a weak form of the axiom of choice that is still sufficient to develop most of real analysis. It was introduced by Paul Bernays in a 1942 article that explores which set-theoretic axioms are needed to develop analysis.

Formal statement 

The axiom of dependent choice can be stated as follows: 
For every nonempty set  and every total relation   on  there exists a sequence  in  such that 
 for all 

In fact, x0 may be taken to be any desired element of X. (To see this, apply the axiom as stated above to the set of finite sequences that start with x0 and in which subsequent terms are in relation , together with the total relation on this set of the second sequence being obtained from the first by appending a single term.)

Use 
Even without such an axiom, for any , one can use ordinary mathematical induction to form the first  terms of such a sequence.
The axiom of dependent choice says that we can form a whole (countably infinite) sequence this way.

The axiom  is the fragment of  that is required to show the existence of a sequence constructed by transfinite recursion of countable length, if it is necessary to make a choice at each step and if some of those choices cannot be made independently of previous choices.

Equivalent statements 
Over Zermelo–Fraenkel set theory ,  is equivalent to the Baire category theorem for complete metric spaces.

Furthermore,  is equivalent to a weakened form of Zorn's lemma; specifically  is equivalent to the statement that any partial order such that every well-ordered chain is finite and bounded, must have a maximal element.

Relation with other axioms 
Unlike full ,  is insufficient to prove (given ) that there is a non-measurable set of real numbers, or that there is a set of real numbers without the property of Baire or without the perfect set property. This follows because the Solovay model satisfies , and every set of real numbers in this model is Lebesgue measurable, has the Baire property and has the perfect set property.

The axiom of dependent choice implies the axiom of countable choice and is strictly stronger.

It is possible to generalize the axiom to produce transfinite sequences. If these are allowed to be arbitrarily long, then it becomes equivalent to the full axiom of choice.

Notes

References 

 

Axiom of choice